The Dictator is a Malaysian Cantonese television drama that began airing on RTM TV2 in Malaysia on 4 April 1995, and ended on 6 June 1995, with a total of 30 episodes.

Cast
 Chak Lam Yeung as Gaan Dung Loi
 Teddy Lin as Gaan Kar Bou/Gwok Jing Hou
 Cheryl Lim as Gaan Bik Jyu
 Ng Zi Jin as Gaan Hang Lin
 Ziu Wing Coi as Zau Gin Keong
 Gou Leon as Lee Wing Jyun
 Hon Jing as Gaan Dung Loi's mother
 Cheng Kam Cheong as Gwok Mong Kai
 Chen Gwai Lin as Gaan Kar Wai
 Wong Zeon Ming as Lau Zi Hung

Chinese-language drama television series in Malaysia